Fitzgibbon, FitzGibbon, Fitz-Gibbon and Fitzgibbons are Irish surnames of Anglo-Norman origin. FitzGibbon and its variants have long been widespread and important surnames within Ireland. The surnames were first found in 12th century Ireland, shortly after the Norman invasion of Ireland, in which two distinct families were established in Limerick and Mayo. 

The surname means "Son of Gibbon", with "Gibbon" being derived from "Gibb", a short form of the popular Norman personal name Gilbert, which was first introduced in the 11th century by followers of William the Conqueror after the Norman Conquest of England. Gilbert was originally derived from the name Gislebert or Gillebert, which is composed of the Germanic elements Gisil which means "hostage", "pledge", or "noble youth," and berht, which means "bright" or "famous."

In Limerick, the noble FitzGerald dynasty established a knighthood under the FitzGibbon family branch. Known as The White Knight, the family held territory in southeast Limerick, near County Cork. The knighthood was descended from John FitzThomas, 1st Baron Desmond, ancestor of The Earls of Desmond and grandson of the Norman baron Maurice FitzGerald, Lord of Llanstephan. The other two branches of the FitzGerald family were known as the Green Knight and the Black Knight, both of which kept the FitzGerald name. in Mayo, those with the surname FitzGibbon (and its variants, such as Gibbon and Gibbons) were originally a branch of the great Burke family, known as MacGibbon Burke, with Anglo-Norman (and later Hiberno-Norman) roots.  

Notable people with the name include:

 Abraham Fitzgibbon (182387), Irish-born railroad engineer
 Agnes Dunbar Moodie Fitzgibbon (1833–1913), Canadian artist
 Allan Fitzgibbon (born before 1968), Australian rugby league footballer
 Andrew Fitzgibbon (184583), Irish soldier who may have been the youngest recipient of the Victoria Cross
 Andrew Fitzgibbon (Engineer) (born 1968), Irish computer vision researcher
 Bernice Fitz-Gibbon (18941982), American advertising executive
 Carol Fitz-Gibbon (1938–2017), British educational researcher and analyst
 Coleen Fitzgibbon (born 1950), American experimental film artist
 Constantine Fitzgibbon (191983), American-born historian, translator and novelist
 Craig Fitzgibbon (born 1977), Australian rugby league footballer
 Daniel Fitzgibbon, (born 1976), Australian Paralympic sailor who competed in the 2008 and 2012 Summer Paralympics
 Darragh Fitzgibbon (born 1997), Irish hurler
 Desmond Fitzgibbon (1890after 1945), British flying ace in the Royal Naval Air Service during World War I
 Edmund FitzGibbon (1608), Irish nobleman
 Edmund Fitzgibbon (bishop) (19252010), Irish-born Roman Catholic bishop in Nigeria
 Edmond Gerald FitzGibbon (18251905), Irish-born Australian barrister and town clerk
 Edward Fitzgibbon (180357), Irish writer who used the pseudonym Ephemera
 Edward E. Fitzgibbon (18471909), American farmer, teacher, and politician
 Eric Fitzgibbon (19362015), Australian politician
 Fred Fitzgibbon (191799), Australian rules footballer
 Gerald Fitzgibbon (disambiguation), multiple people
 Hanorah Philomena FitzGibbon (18891979), New Zealand civilian and military nurse and nursing administrator
 Herb Fitzgibbon (born 1942), U.S. tennis player
 Ian Fitzgibbon (born 1962), Irish film and television actor/director
 James FitzGibbon (17801863), British soldier and hero of the War of 1812
 Joe Fitzgibbon (active from 2012), U.S. politician in the state of Washington
 Joel Fitzgibbon (born 1962), Australian politician
 John Fitzgibbon (disambiguation), multiple people
 John Fitzgibbons (18681941), American politician
 John Bowler Fitzgibbons (born before 1995), American entrepreneur, businessman, and philanthropist
 Joseph Fitzgibbon (18811960), Newfoundland politician
 Lachlan Fitzgibbon (born 1994), Australian rugby league footballer
 Maggie Fitzgibbon (1929–2020), Australian actress and singer
 Sister Mary Irene FitzGibbon (182396), English-born nun who founded the New York Foundling Hospital
 Nick FitzGibbon (born 1987), Canadian football player
 Nora FitzGibbon (1889-1979), New Zealand nurse
 Patricia Fitzgibbon (born before 1984), Irish camogie player
 Paul Fitzgibbon (190375), American football player
 Peter Fitzgibbon (born 1975), Irish international rugby union referee
 Pierre Fitzgibbon, Canadian politician, member of the National Assembly of Quebec (from 2018)
 Richard B. Fitzgibbon, Jr. (192056), U.S. murder victim in Vietnam
 Rosanne Fitzgibbon (19472012), Australian literary editor
 Sally Fitzgibbons (born 1990), Australian professional surfer
 Sandie Fitzgibbon (born before 1982), Irish camogie player
 Shaun Fitzgibbon (born 1986), New Zealand cricketer
 Smacka Fitzgibbon (193079), Australian entertainer
 Theodora FitzGibbon (191691), Irish cookery writer, model and actress
 William Fitzgibbon (active 1890s1900s), Irish hurler

See also 
 Fitzgibbon (disambiguation)
 Thomas Fitzgibbon Moore {active 1800safter 1837}, Newfoundland constable and politician
 White Knight (Fitzgibbon family), a hereditary knighthood within Ireland
 Fitz
 Gibbons (surname)

References

Surnames of Irish origin